Caithness, Sutherland and Easter Ross, may refer to:

 Caithness, Sutherland and Easter Ross (UK Parliament constituency), a Scottish constituency of the House of Commons of the Parliament of the United Kingdom
 Caithness, Sutherland and Easter Ross (Scottish Parliament constituency), a constituency of the Scottish Parliament
 Caithness, Sutherland and Easter Ross, one of three corporate management areas of the Highland Council, Scotland, created in 2007